Richard Harrison may refer to:

Politicians
Richard Harrison (died 1726) (1646–1726), English MP for Lancaster, Hertfordshire and Middlesex
Richard Harrison (British Army officer) (1837–1931), British Quartermaster-General to the Forces and Inspector-General of Fortifications
Richard Harrison (New Zealand politician) (1921–2003), former Speaker of the New Zealand House of Representatives
Richard Harrison (Royalist) (1583–1655), English MP and cavalier
Richard A. Harrison (1824–1904), U.S. Representative from Ohio

Arts and entertainment
Richard Harrison (actor) (born 1936), American actor
Richard Harrison (painter), English painter
Richard Harrison (poet) (born 1957), Canadian poet
Richard Berry Harrison (1864–1935), actor, teacher, dramatic reader and lecturer
Richard Benjamin Harrison (1941–2018), Las Vegas businessman and reality television personality (Pawn Stars), father of Rick Harrison
Richard Harrison, former member of British band Stereolab
Rich Harrison (born 1970), American record producer and songwriter
Rick Harrison (born 1965), Las Vegas businessman and reality television personality (Pawn Stars), son of Richard Benjamin Harrison, father of Corey Harrison
Corey Harrison (Richard Corey Harrison, born 1983), Las Vegas businessman and reality television personality (Pawn Stars), son of Rick Harrison

Academics and scientists
Richard Harrison (scientist), professor at the Rutherford Appleton Laboratory in the United Kingdom
Richard J. Harrison (archaeologist) (born 1949), British archaeologist and academic
Richard J. Harrison (mineralogist), British mineralogist
Richard John Harrison (1920–1999), British anatomist and marine biologist
Dick Harrison (born 1966), Swedish professor of history

Others
Richard Edes Harrison (1901–1994), American cartographer
Richard "Rickey" Harrison (c. 1893–1920), member of the Hudson Dusters street gang in New York City
 Dick Harrison (cricketer) (1881–?), English cricketer

See also
Richard Harison (1748–1829), New York lawyer and politician (surname often misspelled "Harrison")